Joe Darkey (born 22 May 1942) is a former Ghanaian professional boxer who competed in the 1960s. A middleweight he competed in Boxing at the 1964 Summer Olympics - Middleweight, but was defeated in the third round. However two years later in 1966 he participated in the 1966 British Empire and Commonwealth Games and won a gold medal.

1964 Olympic results
Below is the Olympic record of Joe Darkey, a Ghanaian middleweight boxer who competed at the 1964 Tokyo Olympics:

 Round of 32: bye
 Round of 16: defeated James Rosette (United States) by decision, 3-2
 Quarterfinal: lost to Valery Popenchenko (Soviet union) by decision, 0-5

References

1942 births
Living people
Boxers at the 1964 Summer Olympics
Middleweight boxers
Olympic boxers of Ghana
Commonwealth Games gold medallists for Ghana
Boxers at the 1966 British Empire and Commonwealth Games
Boxers at the 1970 British Commonwealth Games
Ghanaian male boxers
Commonwealth Games medallists in boxing
Medallists at the 1966 British Empire and Commonwealth Games